Thad McFadden may refer to:

 Thad McFadden (American football) (born 1962), American football player
 Thad McFadden (basketball) (born 1987), American basketball player